Isidro Díaz Bernabé (born 15 May 1972) is a Spanish retired footballer who played as a right midfielder.

Club career
Born in Valencia, Díaz spent his first years as a senior in Tercera División, with the exception of the 1992–93 season, which ended in relegation from Segunda División B with Real Zaragoza's reserves. In the summer of 1995, he was part of a group of players dubbed "The Three Amigos" – which also included his compatriots Roberto Martínez and Jesús Seba – who were brought to Wigan Athletic by club chairman Dave Whelan; he helped the team win the Third Division title two years later, with the player contributing six goals in 35 matches.

Unable to agree a new deal, Díaz left the club by mutual consent in July 1997 and signed for Wolverhampton Wanderers. He played one game for the latter, a 3–0 away defeat against Oxford United, before returning to Springfield Park later that year; his second spell with Wigan was not as successful, appearing just three times in the league before moving to Rochdale at the end of the season. Midway through 1998–99, he returned to his home country and joined FC Cartagena.

Díaz spent the following seven years in Portugal and its Segunda Liga, appearing and scoring regularly for both Leça FC (one season) and G.D. Chaves (six, where former Zaragoza and Wigan teammate Seba had already played). Aged 34, he returned to Spain and spent two years with Barakaldo CF in the third tier, after which he joined their coaching staff only to return to active shortly after for a brief spell with the reserve side.

Díaz finally retired from football at the age of 40, after playing one and a half seasons with CD Laredo in division four and one with Castro FC in the same league.

References

External links

1972 births
Living people
Spanish footballers
Footballers from Valencia (city)
Association football midfielders
Segunda División B players
Tercera División players
Divisiones Regionales de Fútbol players
CD Teruel footballers
Real Zaragoza B players
CF Balaguer footballers
FC Cartagena footballers
Barakaldo CF footballers
English Football League players
Wigan Athletic F.C. players
Wolverhampton Wanderers F.C. players
Rochdale A.F.C. players
Liga Portugal 2 players
Leça F.C. players
G.D. Chaves players
Spanish expatriate footballers
Expatriate footballers in England
Expatriate footballers in Portugal
Spanish expatriate sportspeople in England
Spanish expatriate sportspeople in Portugal